Not So Dusty is a compilation album of Slim Dusty songs covered by Australian musicians. It was released in Australia by EMI in 1998. It was nominated for a 1999 ARIA Award for Best Country Album.

Not So Dusty received positive reviews and was certified gold. Gary Tippet of the Sunday Age gave it 3 stars and Peter Lalor of the Daily Telegraph gave it 7/10 although he noted that most of the Australian country outfits on the album "seem to bland out with their attempt at authentic outings". Keith Glass writing in the Sunday Herald Sun says "but what could have been a dodgy concept is mainly highly entertaining." The Age's Mike Daly calls it "a splendid tribute by some diverse performer." and the Sunday Mail calls it a "wonderful tribute".

It was reported that Slim Dusty enjoyed the album saying "I've had a lot of tributes over the years but that's a very touching one. I feel very honoured – everyone really put their heart and soul into each track."

Singles
The album's lead single was "Cunnamulla Feller" performed by The Screaming Jets.

Accolades

Track listing

 When the Rain Tumbles Down in July  – Graeme Connors
 Pub With No Beer  – Midnight Oil
 Drowning My Blues  – Tom T. Hall & The McCormacks
 Lights on the Hill – Mental As Anything
 Walk A Country Mile  – Keith Urban
 Losin' My Blues Tonight  – Michael Spiby
 Saddle Boy  – Dead Ringer Band
 Wedding Bell Blues  – Ross Wilson With The Feral Swing Katz
 Indian Pacific  – Tania Kernaghan & Ray Kernaghan
 Things Are Not The Same On The Land  – Karma County
 The Sunlander  – Paul Kelly & Uncle Bill
 The Biggest Disappointment  – Troy Cassar-Daley
 Gumtrees By The Roadway  – Anne Kirkpatrick & David Kirkpatrick
 Highway Fever  – Don Walker
 Plains Of Peppimenarti  – James Blundell
 Cunnamulla Feller  – The Screaming Jets
 Camooweal  – Ed Kuepper & His Oxley Creek Playboys & Felicity
 I Must Have Good Terbaccy When I Smoke – John Williamson

References

Compilation albums by Australian artists
1998 compilation albums